Novi Sad is the capital of the Serbian province of Vojvodina, and second largest city in Serbia.

Political history

The city was founded in 1694 and its first names were Ratzen Stadt and Peterwardein Schantz. Since 1702, it was part of the Habsburg Military Frontier. In 1746-1748, when one part of Military Frontier was abolished, city was placed under civil administration and obtained royal free city status. The edict of empress Maria Theresa of Austria that made Novi Sad a royal free city was proclaimed on February 1, 1748. That is also a time when current name of the city was introduced. In various languages it was written as: Neoplantae (Latin), Neusatz (German), Újvidék (Hungarian), and Novi Sad (Serbian).

During the 1880s, Hungarians took over local city administration from Serbs and their representatives dominated in city government until 1918. After 1918, the city government was again dominated by Serbs. Although it was a cultural and political center of Vojvodinian Serbs (and Serbs in general) in the 19th century, Novi Sad was not administrative center of any larger administrative unit during most of the period of Habsburg administration. Briefly, it was a district center in the Voivodeship of Serbia and Banat of Temeschwar province that existed from 1849 to 1860. Administrative significance of the city highly increased in 1918, when it became part of the Kingdom of Serbs, Croats and Slovenes. In 1918-1919, Novi Sad was capital of Banat, Bačka and Baranja region, and also administrative center of Novi Sad County (from 1918 to 1922). From 1922 to 1929 it was administrative center of Bačka Oblast, and from 1929 to 1941 administrative center of Danube Banovina.

From 1941 to 1944, city was under Axis occupation and occupational authorities degraded status of Novi Sad to administratively unimportant town located on the border between Horthy's Hungary and Pavelić's Independent State of Croatia. After the war, administrative significance of Novi Sad increased again and it became the capital of the Autonomous Province of Vojvodina within People's Republic of Serbia and new socialist Yugoslavia.

From 1980 to 1989, city was divided into seven urban municipalities: Stari Grad, Podunavlje, Liman, Slavija, Petrovaradin, Detelinara and Sremski Karlovci. In 1989, six of those municipalities were merged into single Municipality of Novi Sad, while municipality of Sremski Karlovci was transformed into separate administrative unit, which is completely independent from Novi Sad. In 2000-2002, the Municipality of Novi Sad was changed to City of Novi Sad and two urban municipalities (Novi Sad and Petrovaradin) were formed within the city. Since 2002, when the new statute of Novi Sad came into effect, City of Novi Sad is divided into 46 local communities. City has its parliament, governing mayor and a city council.

Administration bodies

Mayor

The executive branch is headed by the Mayor of Novi Sad City, who is elected by direct popular vote. The mayor serves a term of four years and is limited to two terms in office. Until 2004, all mayors and municipality presidents in Serbia were elected by the city's and municipality parliaments. After changes in the law, in 2004 elections, all mayors and municipality presidents (except for urban municipalities) were elected by direct popular vote.

The City's second mayor elected by direct popular vote in September 2004 was Maja Gojković, who is also the only female yet to be the major political figure of Novi Sad. Afterwards the electoral system was reversed, so city currently has no mayor in classical meaning of the word, but President of the Executive council of the assembly, which is currently Milan Đurić from Serbian Progressive Party.

City Assembly

The Assembly of the City of Novi Sad is the lawmaking body of the City. It comprises 78 members from 46 local communities throughout the two municipalities. The Assembly monitors performance of city agencies and makes land use decisions as well as legislating on a variety of other issues. The Assembly also has sole responsibility for approving the city budget. The Council has seventeen committees with oversight of various functions of the city government. City has also committee for improving and protection of the city's national minorities.

Assembly members are elected every four years. In 2016 local elections, SNS Coalition won most seats in the City parliament, and formed a coalition with Socialist Party of Serbia and the Alliance of Vojvodina Hungarians. Current president of the city parliament is Zdravko Jelušić from Serbian Progressive Party.

City Council 
Council is a body that coordinates between City's parliament and Mayor and manage the City. It has 11 members who are elected by the mayor and confirmed by the parliament. Chairman of the council is the mayor. Council has also a responsibility for conferred City's budget and helps the mayor with governing.

Administrative subdivisions

Municipalities

In 2000-2002, the municipality of Novi Sad was divided into two urban municipalities, Novi Sad and Petrovaradin; making the way on the changes of the law in Serbian parliament which says that the city status in Serbia is only possible if the city is divided into two or more urban municipalities. Since then, the law was changed, and the city need not to be divided into urban municipalities.

Municipality of Novi Sad includes: Novi Sad proper, Futog, Veternik, Begeč, Budisava, Kać, Kovilj, Kisač, Rumenka, Stepanovićevo, and Čenej. Municipality of Petrovaradin includes: Petrovaradin town, Sremska Kamenica, Bukovac, Ledinci, and Stari Ledinci. Geographically, the municipality of Novi Sad is located in Bačka, while municipality of Petrovaradin is located in Syrmia.

By city statute from 2002, Novi Sad's municipalities do not have any "real" power of decision making and do not have bodies which municipalities normally have in Serbia. Like other cities in Serbia, Novi Sad doesn't have direct elections for municipality parliaments. Members of parliament in the Novi Sad's two urban municipalities comprise City's parliament members who are elected in territory of the municipality.

Municipalities of Novi Sad were established because of the sole reason that Novi Sad can get city status within Serbia. Future of this municipalities is questionable, keeping in mind that under new Constitution of Serbia (from November 2006), cities do not have to be divided into municipalities to get city status. There are, however, proposals that city should be further divided into more municipalities. According to the proposal of the Serbian Renewal Movement party, there should be six more municipalities besides Novi Sad and Petrovaradin. New proposed municipalities are Futog, Veternik, Rumenka, Kać, Klisa, and Sremska Kamenica.

Local communities

Both municipalities, Petrovaradin and Novi Sad, are divided into local communities (Serbian: Mesne zajednice / Месне заједнице). There are 47 local communities in the city.

Every local community has its own council, which comprises one or two MPs in the city's parliament and community president. The president is elected by majority of residents on local meetings. Local community has meetings (couple of times in one month). At local meetings are present members of the council as well as local residents. Meetings are good for discussing local maters, like constructions of new buildings, new roads, complaints of the local residents, and to address their local city's MPs, who can pass their complaints on to the city's officials.

City holidays

City also commemorates the year 1694, when it was established.

Street names

Twin towns – sister cities
Novi Sad is twinned with:

 Budva, Montenegro (1996)
 Changchun, China (1981)
 Dortmund, Germany (1982)
 Gomel, Belarus (2013)
 Ilioupoli, Greece (1994)
 Kumanovo, North Macedonia (2019)
 Modena, Italy (1974)
 Nizhny Novgorod, Russia (2006)
 Norwich, England, United Kingdom (1989)
 Pécs, Hungary (2009)
 Timișoara, Romania (2005)
 Toluca, Mexico (2015)

Cooperation agreements
Novi Sad cooperates with:

 Banja Luka, Bosnia and Herzegovina (2006)
 Enghien-les-Bains, France
 Frunzensky District, Russia (2003)
 Gothenburg, Sweden (2002)
 Krasnodar, Russia
 Lviv, Ukraine (1999)
 Nant, France (2002)
 Oryol, Russia (2017)
 Osijek, Croatia (2002)
 Saint-Leu-la-Forêt, France
 Taverny, France (2019)
 Tuzla Bosnia and Herzegovina (2002)
 Ulm, Germany (2002)

References

External links
Official site of city assembly